Vaipur is a village located on the banks of the Manimala River, in Pathanamthitta District, Kerala, India. It is part of the  Thiruvalla constituency.

References 

 The Pulincunnu Vachaparampil family website
 Nedumkunnam Puthiaparampil family history
 PJTomy, 'Portuguese Contribution to Kerala' lists Vaipur parish as one of the 180 parishes that were represented at the Synod of Diamper, 1599.
Kallooppara Church History
Niranam Church

External links
Pathanamthitta Police map of Mallappally Taluk

Villages in Pathanamthitta district